Dance Again World Tour was the first worldwide concert tour by American entertainer Jennifer Lopez. Throughout the majority of her music career, beginning in 1999, a world tour by Lopez was anticipated, though it never materialized. Following the release of her seventh studio album Love? (2011), she was more intent on touring than ever. However, it was not until March 2012 when the tour came into the works. As rumors began to circulate, Lopez later confirmed that April that she would be embarking on her first ever world tour. It commenced on June 14, 2012, in Panama, and concluded on December 22, 2012 in Puerto Rico.

Fashion designer Zuhair Murad, a frequent collaborator of Lopez, designed all of the tour's costumes. Lopez, who creatively directed the show, included several different personal themes into the tour, which was split into four parts. These themes included old Hollywood glamour, funk, love and partying, as well as Lopez's "Jenny from the Block" persona and her hip-hop upbringing in The Bronx, New York. Generally, Lopez aimed to convey a message about dancing again and feeling innovated.

The tour received acclaim from critics, with most complimenting Lopez on her choreography and stage act as well as physicality. It was described as an "explosion" of color and sound which proved Lopez's vocal ability while also remaining faithful to her humble "Jenny from the Block" persona.

Background 
Following her two Let's Get Loud concerts in 2001, Lopez announced she would like to go on a full tour in 2002, however, this plan did not come to fruition. In January 2005, Lopez revealed to MTV News that  she was in the midst of planning a tour to support her fourth studio album, Rebirth. Lopez stated: "I've tried to plan a tour so many times [...] And we're planning it again. It's exciting. We'll see if it happens [...] I've learned not to get my hopes up. I can't wait!" Lopez also added that she envisioned the tour as "Just me doing my thing". However, details for a tour were never unveiled and there subsequently was never one. In May 2011, Lopez announced plans to launch a tour in support of her seventh studio album Love?. Lopez stated that: "My fans have waited a long time for this. We really want to do it at least once in my lifetime."

In March 2012, it was announced that Lopez would headline two popular music festivals in Brazil. While promoting the announcement, the singer mentioned she would like to venture onto a world tour "at some point".

Development 

In April 2012, a source told Celebuzz, "J.Lo and her team have blocked out more than a month of their schedules, beginning May 4, to start intense rehearsals, each day, at a sound stage in the Los Angeles area. This will be a huge tour, complete with a lavish set, full band and team of dancers." The Dance Again World Tour was directed by famed tour director Jamie King, alongside Casper Smart, who also served as its choreographer. Lopez served as creative director of the set, which consisted of an eighteen-body band including dancers. Her manager Benny Medina was executive producer, while managing the show alongside Steve Brumbach.

Lopez incorporated several personal themes into the tour, which reflected upon different aspects of her career. During an interview with the Australian television series Today, she explained that she "wanted to put on something" that her fans would "really be satisfied with". "There's a lot of different sides of me" she stated, "[There's] kinda like the Jenny from the Block side and this glamour Hollywood persona, red carpet thing." Lopez wanted to "make sure" she "got it all" in there for her fans. As an artist, Lopez felt that it was her job to "bare" her soul, and wanted her concert viewers to walk away with her message of dancing again. She told the website HollywoodLife, "I had control to deliver this message, so I did. I wanted to have the audience leave a little more hopeful. They jumped, danced, felt silly and may now would be thinking, 'Ok things didn't work out before, but maybe this time, it will.'"

Wardrobe 

Lebanese fashion designer Zuhair Murad designed Lopez's costumes and fabrication for the Dance Again World Tour. Lopez revealed to People in May 2012, "Zuhair Murad is going to do all my costumes. We're still thinking about [the looks]." Murad has designed pieces, which are described as "capricious designs", for Lopez frequently over the years. In 2010, a dress he designed for Lopez evoked "crying", while creating a "spider web-inspired bodysuit" for her performance at KIIS-FM's Wango Tango concert the following year. Additionally, Murad was responsible for Lopez's dress at the Academy Awards in 2012 having "ingeniously stole the show from nearly every other red carpet guest". Rolling Stones Colleen Nika spoke positively about Murad designing the wardrobe, "Whatever looks the two end up conjuring together, they're guaranteed, on Lopez's shapely form, to strike a sexy, maximalist note". Lopez was a big fan of Murad's creations, often sporting them on American Idol.

Lopez's wardrobe for the tour includes "a feathered skirt and hat, a jumpsuit, a cape, a bodysuit and several short dresses". On June 12, 2012, Murad unveiled the tour's first costume sketches. The dress she was wearing "features thousands of red beads hand-sewn onto nude silk tulle in a flame pattern". Murad was also reported, at the time, to have been working on a bodysuit and several short frocks. Overall, Murad created six new looks for Lopez's show.

Lopez was forced to conceal her provocative performance and wardrobe by conservative Muslim laws. This occurred at her Indonesian concert. Chairi Ibrahim, project manager for the venue, told CNN that "She'll have to cover up a little bit" as well as altering her "sexual dance moves" and stage performance. Lopez's back-up dancers also had to alter their appearance. Instead, during her Jakarta concert she wore "a baggy silver jumpsuit, which concealed her famous curvaceous figure, as opposed to the tour's signature nude sparkling cat jumpsuit, which she regularly wore on tour" according to The Jakarta Post. Her back-up dancers had to cover their "bare chests" and "revealing cleavage".

Concert synopsis 

The Dance Again World Tour is split into four acts. The first is based around an old Hollywood glamour theme. A large curtain printed with the "J.Lo" logo printed appears. The 90-minute show begins with a broadway themed video clip of Lopez, set to the song "Never Gonna Give Up". A group of male dancers with top hats perform an opening sequence, before the curtain drops. Lopez makes her glamorous entrance, while wearing the feathered skirt. She rips the skirt off, revealing a sparkly catsuit. She greets the crowds, "Hello Lovers, Let's get it!", before she opens with "Get Right". Her performance of a "rocked-out" version of "Get Right" contained "infectious horn riffs". She then quickly switches to "Love Don't Cost a Thing", before stopping to greet the audience again. She resumes with performances of "I'm Into You", featuring Lil Wayne on the big screen, and "Waiting for Tonight". "Love Don't Cost a Thing" features a fold-out chair, while "Waiting for Tonight" is performed on a white moving platform set up on the stage.

Following an intercession, the concert's second act, dedicated to Lopez's upbringing in The Bronx, New York and her hip-hop roots, begins. It includes a medley, choreographed by Parris Goebel. Featured artists of all songs appear on the big screen. The act begins with a boxing video set to the song "Louboutins". The message is to  "get back when you fall down". A boxing ring then appears on stage and Lopez emerges with a different costume, a gold cape, and sings "Goin' In". Her dancers are seen wearing gold and black boxing gloves with glitter on them. After her performance of "Goin' In" finished, Lopez states, "Do you see the fight earlier? When we fall down, we have to get up. It's also how we do it where I come from." Additionally, Lopez talks about the fight: how the "little guy" fell down and got back up despite high competition.

Following this, the "Back-to-Bronx" medley begins. She is seen wearing a tilted silver cap. She breaks into "I'm Real", "All I Have" and the murder remix version of "Ain't It Funny". She finishes off this act with "Jenny from the Block". Before performing the song, Lopez states, "I'm just a simple girl from the Bronx. Don't believe all this glitter. I'm just a girl from New York, a long way from home." In another concert she states, "I'm just a simple girl from the Bronx with a humble beginning." Robert Copsey of Digital Spy stated that the mood of this was: "fitting for an artist of whom many of her hits punctuated the crowd's teenagehoods", while Rachael Wheeler of Daily Mirror said: "Watching the concert was like going back through my teenage years, past drunken house parties at uni and all the way up to a night out last week."

The concert's third act is based around a theme of "Funk & Love" with an old-school uptown theater theme. During the intermission between the second and third part, a video clip of Lopez and her boyfriend to the song "Baby I Love U!" plays. She then states: "Enough of this lovey dovey shit, gimme some funk!" and sings "Hold It, Don't Drop It". A medley of "I'm Glad", "Brave", "Secretly" then occurs. After a minor break, Lopez returns to the stage and slows it down for a performance of the acoustic version of "If You Had My Love", and then a heart-warming performance of "Until It Beats No More" while a slideshow video clip featuring pictures and video clips of her and her four-year-old twins is played in the background. During both songs, she wore a flowing turquoise dress and basked in "purple light and smoke".

The fourth act is based around a partying theme. After retreating backstage following "Until It Beats No More", Lopez returns on-stage wearing a tuxedo with pink ruffles while playing a bongo. She then opens this section with "Let's Get Loud" right after playing the bongo drums. As the performance progressed, her dancers ripped off the tuxedo to reveal a black-laced body suit. She then breaks into "Papi" and then "On the Floor". The show's encore is a performance of "Dance Again". The opening of the performance featured a video clip in which a masked Lopez declared "You will live, you will love...and you will Dance Again". She is joined by her boyfriend Casper Smart on stage, who also appears in the music video for the song, during the song's dancebreak.

Commercial performance 
Several of Lopez's shows have garnered her spots on Billboards Box-score lists. Her Valencia, Venezuela concert made the list's top-ten, ranking at nine having grossed a total of $1,748,020 with 4,900 tickets sold. Her concert in Zürich, Switzerland was ranked twenty-five on the list having grossed $1,142,530 with 10,400 tickets sold. The tour's American leg generated $21.2 million at the box office. With ticket sales reported from the first fifteen concert arenas, the tour's revenue reached over $12.7 million, from 164,481 sold seats. For the week of August 31, 2012, Iglesias and Lopez were ranked No. 2 on Billboards list of "Top 10 Grossing Tours". All of the leg's concerts, excluding one show in Atlanta, were sold out.

Lopez's concert in Manila, Philippines sold out fully, and according to Manila Times, audiences had to endure "hellish traffic" to get to the venue. In Australia, twenty $800 "meet and greet" tickets were made available per show and successfully sold out swiftly. The tickets were considered over-priced, labeled as "overwhelming" by news.com.au. Her Dubai concert tickets sold out quickly. Sally Edwards, Director of the Dubai Calendar, said Lopez "has shown us why she has been named the number one global celebrity by Forbes Magazine" and called the success overwhelming. Of her Dubai concert, Natalie Long of Tabloid! noted that Lopez sold out at the Dubai Media City Amphitheatre months ahead of time which marked a "rarity".

Critical response 

The Dance Again World Tour garnered acclaim throughout its run. Of her concert in Recife, where it rained, The Huffington Posts Ashley Percival said Lopez's "sex-pack was on show for all to see" as she was "still getting her impressive bod out despite the downpour", calling her a "trooper" for dancing in the rain. Cory Lopez of Celebuzz praised Lopez's physicality and said "despite the heavy downpour, a smiling J.Lo kept the show going". Rachael Wheeler of Daily Mirror described the show as an "explosion of sound, dance and colour". Wheeler said that while Lopez was "a very small singer on a very big stage" she "absolutely dominated The O2, with massive routines full of hardcore choreography seeing the former dancer strutting." The Guardians Caroline Sullivan said of Lopez's stage performance "At the end, it isn't J-Lo the mother or even J-Lo the diva who sticks in the mind, but Jenny from the block, who still knows where she came from". Robert Copsey of the British website Digital Spy said that Lopez looks "mind-bogglingly youthful and trim", and said that her boxing-ring performance of "Goin' In" allowed her "to display her enviable abs and hi-NRG dance moves."

A writer from Today's Zaman said "her stage performance was visually enriched by lasers, costumes, and dance moves", while Turkish Weekly said that she "blew away her fans". According to the website Novinite, her Bulgarian concert audience was "mesmerized" by her. Natalie Long from Tabloid praised her uptempo performance but also praised her vocals on "Until It Beats No More", stating that she "proved she was the perfect American Idol judge" with "great pipes". Pocholo Concepción of the Philippine Daily Inquirer described her performance in Manila, Philippines as "spellbinding" and wrote that her stage act was "powerful enough to soften the hearts of skeptics and critics. Backed by a six-member live band and two backup vocalists, Lopez couldn't do anything wrong – even if at times her solo singing spots revealed the inadequacy of her vocal skills." Amanda Lago of GMA News said that the beginning of the Filipino show was "slightly underwhelming" but the crowd "cheered endlessly and cried out" for Lopez. Lago criticized Lopez's by noting that while "the dancing was flawless from the get-go" the vocals weren't.

Hans Nicholas Jong of The Jakarta Post called her Jakarta concert an "explosion of color and sound filled with intricate, heart-pounding choreography" which proved that "she really is still Jenny from the Block". Jong said that she "hit all the dance moves while singing in-tune at the same time without seemingly breaking a single sweat." Chairi Ibrahim from Dyandra Entertainment praised the concert for Lopez having toned it down, stating Lopez was "very cooperative ... she respected our culture." Despite this, some fans felt that she should have appeared "the way she is". Han Wei Chou of Channel NewsAsia said that "There really wasn't a single dull moment" at her Singapore concert, calling her performance "thoroughly enjoyable" to the audience who were "screaming in approval". Reviewing her Australian concert, Ross McRae of The West Australian said the audience "went wild" and Lopez "lapped up every minute". He noted that Lopez's vocals were "strong and more than capable recreating the radio and club hits" she performed. McRae also praised her humbleness, noting that she was "actually excited about being on stage performing for her fans, rather than a pop diva." Craig Mathieson from The Sydney Morning Herald wrote that it wasn't as "slick as some pop tours" and lacked "momentum and a definable peak".

Concert film 
The Dance Again World Tour was filmed in 3D for an upcoming theatrical film, entitled Dance Again. The film's producer, Simon Fields, described it as a "high energy documentary" that will "combine 3D concert performances with 2D-lensed documentary content, which will be shot during Lopez's world tour on stops in Europe, Asia and Australia". According to Fields, the documentary portion of the film will follow both Lopez's personal and professional life, including "her reflections on her romantic happiness" following her divorce from Marc Anthony. Ality Technica will be handling the 3D production for the movie, while Ted Kenney will direct the 3D shoots. Fields, Benny Medina and Lopez will executive produce the film through Nuyorican Productions. Filming for the film began on the October 5 concert in Lisbon, Portugal. At a point, Lopez confirmed that the film would be released in Spring 2013 without occurring. On December 12, 2014, HBO and HBO Latino announced their plans to air the concert film, Jennifer Lopez: Dance Again, on December 31, 2014. The film also aired for a twenty-four hour marathon from December 31, 2014 to January 1, 2015 on HBO Zone.

Opening acts 
 Frankie J (North America)
Stooshe (Europe)
Ivete Sangalo (Brazil)
Emin (Baku)
Pascal Nouma (Turkey)
Kate Alexa (Australia)
Anna Sedakova (Russia)

Set list 
The following setlist was obtained from some European concerts. It does not represent all concerts for the duration of the tour.

"Get Right"
"Love Don't Cost a Thing"
"I'm Into You"
"Waiting for Tonight (Hex Hector Remix)"
"Louboutins" 
"Goin' In"
"I'm Real (Murder Remix)" 
"All I Have"
"Feelin' So Good" ¹
"Ain't It Funny (Murder Remix)"
"Jenny from the Block"
 "Brave" / "I'm Glad" / "Secretly" / "Starting Over" 
"If You Had My Love" 
"Que Hiciste"
"Until It Beats No More"
"Baby I Love U!"
"Do It Well"
"Hold It Don't Drop It"
"Let's Get Loud"
"Papi"
"On the Floor"
"Dance Again Intro 
"Dance Again"
¹ Performed at selected dates.

Notes 
 "Follow the Leader": was performed right after the "Encore" with the duo Wisin y Yandel on June 16, 2012 in Caracas, Venezuela.
 "Whatever You Wanna Do": was last performed on June 21, 2012 in Buenos Aires, Argentina. From there it was excluded from the setlist.
 "Love Don't Cost a Thing", "I'm into You", "Waiting for Tonight" and "Goin 'In": were not performed at the show on July 1 in Recife, Brazil. As the heavy rain fell on the site, the first block was cut. The show started with "Get Right", which was created by the block with the Bronx Song Medley and later Jenny from the Block. Also, the costumes and the order of the songs were changed.
 "Waiting for Tonight": from the show in Montreal, Canada, on July 14, 2012 the song was presented with the insertion of the original version in the remix. Previously only a version remix was sung.
 "Feelin 'So Good", "Do It Well" and "Que Hiciste": were excluded from the setlist from July 1 in Recife. It was subsequently only performed on October 4, 2012 in Lisbon, Portugal for an exclusive show for 1,500 fans.
 "No Me Queda Mas": Added to the setlist on July 20, 2012 no concert held in Newark, USA. Lopez sings this song after the acoustic version of If You Had My Love. Jennifer sings in honor of singer Selena.
 "On the Floor": In all the shows in Brazil and Portugal, Jennifer sang in english the song "Chorando Se Foi" as an introduction to "On the Floor". In other countries Jennifer sings the introduction in Spanish.

Tour dates

Cancelled shows

Credits 
Credits adapted from the Dance Again World Tour program booklet.
Performance and band

Jennifer Lopez – Artist, creative director
Gilbert Saldivar – Dance captain
Jose Hernandez – Dancer
Felix Crego - Dancer 
Cat Rendic – Dancer
George Jones, Jr. – Dancer
Jimmy Smith – Dancer
Chase Benz – Dancer
John Silver – Dancer
Shannon Holtzapffel – Dancer
Tera Perez – Dancer

Lake Smits – Dancer
Bryant Siono – Bass
Adam Hawley – Guitar
Carnell Harrell – Key 1
Norman Jackson – Key 2
Charles Streeter – Drums
Fausto Cuevas III – Percussionist
Erin Stevenson – BGV1
Belle Johnson – BGV1

Production

Benny Medina – Executive producer, management
Beau "Casper" Smart – Co-creative director, supervising choreographer
Kim Burse – Music director
Sean Burke – Production Designer, Lighting, Stage Set, Video
Thaddis "Kuk" Harrell – Sound design and production
Dago Gonzalez – Video content creative director
Tiana Rios – Producer (Nuyorican films)
Ana Carbollosa – Tour photographer
J.R. Taylor – Choreographer: "Dance Again", "Love Don't Cost a Thing", "Waiting for Tonight"
Parris Goebel – Choreographer: "Back to the Bronx" medley, "Goin' In"
Mariel Haenn – Stylist and costume design
Rob Zangardi – Stylist and costume design
Kelly Johnson – Wardrobe supervisor
Zuhair Murad – Costume design and fabrication
Lorenzo Martin – Hair stylist
Mary Phillips – Make-up artist
Geetanjali "Gilly" Lyer – Management, tour programme supervisor
Mark Young – Publicist
Michael Dermen – Executive assistant to Benny Medina

Cassandra Krcmar – Executive assistant to Benny Medina
Debbi "Summer Izzard" – Executive assistant to Lopez
Yari Hernandez – Assistant to Lopez
Day Ryan – Assistant to Lopez
Yvetta Young – Music and band coordinator
Carmen Romero – Masseuse
Gus A Zambrano – Chief security
Raul Ibanez – Security
Diego Scalia – Security
Marco Battini – Security
Brendon Johnston – Strength and conditioning coach
Ana Carbollosa – Tour programme photographer
Steven Gomillion – Photographer
Dennis Leupold – Photographer
Mario Testino – Photographer
Kevin Mazur – Photographer
Mr. Scott Design – Tour program layout and design
Alexis Gudilino – Director of tour documentary

Crew

Steve Brumbach – Tour manager
Jon Martin – Tour accountant
Lauren Abderrahman – Road manager
Nancy Ghosh – Advance team
Omar Abderrahman – Production manager
Carl Clasulli – Stage manager
Eric Piontkowski – Assistant stage manager
Lauren Temple – Production Coordinator
Dillan Esco – Production Coordinator
Marley Engebretsen – Dressing room coordinator
Jill Focke – Head of wardrobe
Skylar Christensen – Wardrobe assistant
Matt Hammond – Props
Scott Christensen – Carpenter
Joe Rogers – Carpenter
Marty Zilio – Carpenter
Brian Benauer – Carpenter
James Ford – Carpenter
Art McConnell – Rigger
Jeremy Benauer – Rigger
Eric Camp – FOH Engineer
Vish Wadi – Monitor engineer
Mike Monteiro – Playback/Pro Tools engineer
Paul Jump – Audio
Jennifer Smala – Audio
Ricardo Roman – Audio

Adam Collins – Audio
John Ciasulli – Guitar tech
Ed Faris – Keyboard tech
Joe Addington – Drum tech
James Such – Lightning
Ken Burns – Lightning
Mark England – Lightning
Gareth Morgan – Lightning
Dave Prior – Lightning
Mark Weil – Lightning
Andrew Williamson – Lightning
Rob Darcy  – Video
Zach Peletz  – Video
Alex Keene  – Video
Allison Sulock  – Video
Nick Strand  – Video
Scott Williamson  – Video
Bruce Ramos  – Video
Paul Maddock-Jones  – Video
Steve Aleff  – Pyro
Travis Jameson – Pyro
William Ingato  – Pyro
Scott Cunningham  – Lasers
Courtney Keene  – Catering
William Perez  – Cat Power
Craig McCulloch  – Bravado merchandise vendor

Notes

References 

2012 concert tours
Jennifer Lopez concert tours
Concert tours of South America
Concert tours of Europe
Concert tours of Asia
Concert tours of Australia
Concert tours of North America